"The Irish Roar" is a song released in May 2016 as the official anthem of the Republic of Ireland national soccer team for the 2016 European Championships, held in France. The song was performed by trad-pop group Seo Linn.

They were commissioned to write the song after meeting FAI Chief Executive John Delaney on Easter Monday 2016. The song incorporates lyrics from the traditional song "Óró sé do bheatha abhaile."

Reception
RTÉ's John Byrne complimented "The Irish Roar", calling it "a bit of a belter." However, Robert McNamara of The Irish Examiner called it "a bit of a bland effort set to dance beat with a bit of ceilí and qualifying commentary lumped in for good measure. Uninspiring."

Chart performance

References

External links
"The Irish Roar" on Soundcloud

2016 singles
Republic of Ireland national football team songs
Republic of Ireland at UEFA Euro 2016
Football songs and chants
2016 songs